Chenkara is a small village in Kothamanglam Ernakulam Kerala India. It is located on the bank of the Periyar. It is also near Bhoothathankettu, a tourist place in Kothamangalam.

Temple
Chenkara cavu (kavu) is a temple situated in the middle of village. The main deity is Naagarajavu (god of snakes). The main festival is Sarpampattu, which is conducted once every three years. During the festival Naagarajavu is believed to enter devotees body's and they will dance like a snake in front of 'Sarpakalam' (a picture of snake made by natural colors').

Tourist destination
With beautiful landscape and hill station, Chenkara is located 8 km from famous Thekkady Tiger Reservoir and Wildlife Sanctuary, Kerala. This is an emerging and untouched tourist destination located near to the famous South Indian tourist destinations like Thekkady, Kuttikkanam and Vagamon.
Chenkara is beautifully surrounded by a range of eight mountains (Ashta Dhik Palakar) which include Kurisumala (Cross hill) and two brother hills, locally called as Annan (Elder Brother) and Thampi (Younger Brother) hills. A beautiful pond on the extreme top of Cross hills around 4500 feet heigh, Chenkara is known for its lush green surroundings and beautiful meadows of tea plantation.

References

Villages in Alappuzha district